Anna Jessica Zandén (born 28 March 1957) is a Swedish actress. She has appeared in more than 50 films and television shows since 1983. She is the sister of actor Philip Zandén.

Selected filmography
 Freud's Leaving Home (1991)
 The Ferris Wheel (1993)
 In Bed with Santa (1999)
 Once in a Lifetime (2000)
 Beck – Levande begravd (2009)
 Vår tid är nu (2017-2021)

References

External links

1957 births
Living people
20th-century Swedish actresses
21st-century Swedish actresses
Swedish film actresses
Swedish television actresses
Actresses from Stockholm